is a Japanese football player. He plays for Thespakusatsu Gunma.

Career
Naoya Yoshida joined Tonan Maebashi in 2017. In August, he moved to Thespakusatsu Gunma.

Club statistics
Updated to 22 February 2018.

References

External links

Profile at Thespakusatsu Gunma

1994 births
Living people
University of Tsukuba alumni
Association football people from Saitama Prefecture
Japanese footballers
J2 League players
J3 League players
Thespakusatsu Gunma players
Association football midfielders